Cheddikulam Hospital is a government hospital in Cheddikulam, Sri Lanka. It is controlled by the provincial government in Jaffna. As of 2010 it had 425 beds. The hospital is sometimes called Cheddikulam Base Hospital or Cheddikulam District Hospital.

References

Cheddikulam
Hospitals in Vavuniya District
Provincial government hospitals in Sri Lanka